Ranulph Dacre (23 April 1797 – 27 June 1884) was a British master mariner and merchant active in Australia and New Zealand.

Early life

He was born to George and Julia Dacre at Marwell Hall, Hampshire, England on 23 April 1797. His father was High Sheriff of Hampshire and a colonial of militia. When he was 13 years of age Ranaulf joined the Royal Navy and remained in the service for six years. After leaving the navy he joined the merchant marine. His first voyage, in 1816, was to the West Indies. He was a master mariner by 1821, commanding the Barbados Packet for Thomas Barkworth between 1821 and 1823.

In Australia

He arrived in Australia in August 1823 as master of Elizabeth (363 tons) owned by London merchant Robert Brooks, who was also aboard. Dacre and Brooks jointly purchased the schooner Endeavour (61 tons) which Dacre commanded on a voyage to New Zealand and Tahiti. At Tahiti Dacare took aboard the Reverend Daniel Tyerman and George Bennet (missionary) on their famous inspection tour of South Sea missions, and gave them passage to Sydney. He continued to trade around the region, and made two voyages back to Britain on the Surry, before deciding, in about 1830, to settle in Australia.

He was the local agent for Robert Brooks in Sydney. He also became a prominent merchant in his own right. He owned a number of ships and a wharf, from which he traded to the islands and engaged in pelagic whaling. He was slow to repatriate funds to Brooks in London, sometimes using them for new speculative ventures in Sydney. A major economic depression began in 1840 and his financial situation became critical. His poor record-keeping was another issue that prompted Brooks to replace him as his agent in 1843 with another master mariner, Robert Towns.

In New Zealand

Dacre traded successfully with the Maori population of New Zealand, including Eruera Maihi Patuone. He moved to New Zealand in the mid 1840s and made claims on land he had bought from the Maori before 1840. In Auckland he went into business in 1844 with James Macky. In 1848 he purchased a 3,334 acre block of land south of Orewa on which two of his sons later established a cattle station. Other land purchases included a 4,000 acre property at Omaha. In 1854 he went into business with Thomas Macky and they traded as merchants and shipping agents.

After commuting between Australia and New Zealand, Dacre and family settled in Auckland in 1859. T. Macky & Co had become by then one of the largest firms in the city. Dacre lived on the slopes of Official Bay and he was active in the Anglican church. By 1882, he had restored his fortunes and owned more than 9,000 acres of land, worth almost £10,000. He was living in London when he died on 27 June 1884. The couple had 7 sons and at least 1 daughter.

References and notes

1797 births
1884 deaths
New Zealand traders
English emigrants to New Zealand
People from the City of Winchester
Australian people in whaling
Australian sailors
Australian ship owners
Sea captains
19th-century Australian businesspeople